The 1964–65 Mexican Segunda División was the 15th season of the Mexican Segunda División. The season started on 6 June 1964 and concluded on 27 December 1964. It was won by Ciudad Madero.

Changes 
 Cruz Azul was promoted to Primera División.
 Refinería Madero was renamed as Ciudad Madero.
 Puebla joined the league.
 Salamanca returned to the league after three seasons on hiatus.
 The Chapingo Autonomous University became co-owner of the C.D. Texcoco, for which the team was renamed as Chapingo Texcoco.

Teams

League table

Results

References 

1964–65 in Mexican football
Segunda División de México seasons